Reton Lake is a lake in the U.S. state of Wisconsin.

Reton Lake was named after J. O. Reton, an early settler.

References

Lakes of Wisconsin
Bodies of water of Portage County, Wisconsin